Diego Fernando Benítez Quintana (born January 23, 1988 in Colonia, Uruguay), is a professional Uruguayan footballer who plays as a forward.

Club career
In December 2018, Benítez signed with Alianza FC of the Salvadoran Primera División.

References

External links
 
Diego Fernando Benítez at BDFA.com.ar

1988 births
Living people
Uruguayan footballers
Association football forwards
Defensor Sporting players
FC Dinamo București players
Club Plaza Colonia de Deportes players
C.D. Técnico Universitario footballers
C.D. Universidad Católica del Ecuador footballers
Deportivo Municipal footballers
S.D. Aucas footballers
C.S.D. Macará footballers
Rampla Juniors players
Miramar Misiones players
Manta F.C. footballers
Uruguayan Primera División players
Liga II players
Ascenso MX players
Ecuadorian Serie A players
Ecuadorian Serie B players
Peruvian Primera División players
Uruguayan expatriate footballers
Uruguayan expatriate sportspeople in Mexico
Expatriate footballers in Mexico
Uruguayan expatriate sportspeople in Romania
Expatriate footballers in Romania
Uruguayan expatriate sportspeople in Ecuador
Expatriate footballers in Ecuador
Uruguayan expatriate sportspeople in Peru
Expatriate footballers in Peru
Uruguayan expatriate sportspeople in El Salvador
Expatriate footballers in El Salvador